Einar Meidell Hopp (1 December 1899 – 18 May 1956) was a Norwegian broadcasting personality. 

He was born in Bergen, a son of Kristian Hopp and Anna Christine Meidell. He was the brother of Egil Meidell Hopp. He married Zinken Hopp in 1932. He managed the broadcasting in Bergen over a period of thirty years, interrupted by World War II, when he served in the Norwegian Armed Forces in exile.

References 

1899 births
1956 deaths
Mass media people from Bergen
NRK people
Norwegian Army personnel of World War II